Old Mill is a subway station on Line 2 Bloor–Danforth of the Toronto subway in Toronto, Ontario, Canada. It is located at 2672 Bloor Street West at Old Mill Terrace and Humber Boulevard in the Kingsway residential neighbourhood. Nearby destinations include the Old Mill Inn and Park Lawn Cemetery. Wi-Fi service is available at this station.

History
The station opened in 1968 in what was then the Borough of Etobicoke.

In 2000, the station was damaged by a fire on a waste collection train, just after the subway had closed for the night. This was most likely caused by a lit cigarette disposed of in a garbage can at another station. After this incident, the TTC switched to leaving waste outside stations for collection by truck.

Subway infrastructure
The station is built on the west side of the Humber River valley. The west end of the station lies underground with the tunnel continuing toward Royal York. The east end of the platform is elevated on a viaduct that takes the line across the river to re-enter the tunnel on the other side of the valley toward Jane Station.

Glass walls at the train platform's east end provide a view of the riverside park. Bird of prey shaped cutouts have been applied to these large windows to reduce the number of avian fatalities.

From when the station opened in 1968 until 1973, buses and the subway trains serving the station were in separate fare zones and the station's bus loop was located outside the street entrance. Although the bus platforms have still not been integrated into the station's fare-paid area, since only the one bus route is affected, this has a relatively minor impact on the flow of passengers through the turnstiles.

Surface connections

The station's bus platform is not within the fare-paid area.

TTC routes serving the station include:

References

External links

Line 2 Bloor–Danforth stations
Railway stations in Canada opened in 1968
Transport in Etobicoke